Lepanthes helicocephala is a species of orchid native to the Neotropics.

References 

helicocephala